Svea may refer to:

Name
 Svea (name), Swedish female given name meaning "Swede"
 Mother Svea, personification of Sweden
 Svea (singer) (Svea Virginia Kågemark, born 1999), a Swedish singer

Places
 United States
 Svea, Florida, unincorporated community 
 Svea, Minnesota, unincorporated community
 Svea Township, Kittson County, Minnesota
 Svealand, the historical core of Sweden, around Stockholm
 Svea Research Station, Antarctica
 Sveagruva, also called Svea, a mining settlement in Svalbard, Norway
 Svea Airport
 Svea Glacier

Svealand military units
 Svea Life Guards, 1521–2000
 Svea Artillery Regiment, 1794–1997 
 Svea Engineer Corps, 1855–1997 
 Svea Logistic Corps, 1891–1997

Vehicles
 Svea-class coastal defence ship, a class of three Swedish Navy ships 
 Any of the ships named 
 Svea, a J-class yacht
 Svea Velocipede, 19th-century bicycle

Companies
 Rederi AB Svea, shipping
 Svea Fireworks, fireworks importer 
 Svea Flyg, airline

Other uses
 Mother Svea, personification of Sweden
 Svea Court of Appeal, appellate court in Stockholm
 Order of Svea, a Swedish fraternal order

 329 Svea, a main belt asteroid
 Svea 123, a model of liquid-fuel stoves
 SVEA (slowly varying envelope approximation), a method in optics to solve the electromagnetic wave equation